Parthenina mauritanica is a species of sea snail, a marine gastropod mollusk in the family Pyramidellidae, the pyrams and their allies. The specific name mauritanica refers to the country where it was found, Mauritania.

References

 Peñas, A.; Rolán, E.; Swinnen, F. (2014). The superfamily Pyramidelloidea Gray, 1840 (Mollusca, Gastropoda, Heterobranchia) in West Africa, 11. Addenda 3. Iberus. 32(2): 105-206 page(s): 114

External links
 To Encyclopedia of Life
 To USNM Invertebrate Zoology Mollusca Collection

Pyramidellidae
Gastropods described in 1998
Invertebrates of West Africa